(+)-Epicubenol synthase (EC 4.2.3.64, farnesyl pyrophosphate cyclase) is an enzyme with systematic name (2E,6E)-farnesyl-diphosphate diphosphate-lyase ((+)-epicubenol-forming). This enzyme catalyses the following chemical reaction

 (2E,6E)-farnesyl diphosphate + H2O  (+)-epicubenol + diphosphate

This enzyme requires Mg2+.

References

External links 
 

EC 4.2.3